Minersville is an unincorporated community in Chester Township, Meigs County, in the U.S. state of Ohio.

References

Unincorporated communities in Meigs County, Ohio
Unincorporated communities in Ohio